John Currie (c.1670–1720) was a Church of Scotland minister who served as Moderator of the General Assembly in 1709.

Life

He was born in Ochiltree, in Ayrshire, around 1670.

He was ordained as minister of Oldhamstocks, in East Lothian, in 1695. He was translated to St Mary's in Haddington in 1704. He received a call to St Cuthbert's in Edinburgh in 1706 but this was blocked by Presbytery. He received a fresh call in 1710.

In 1709 he succeeded Rev William Carstares as Moderator of the General Assembly of the Church of Scotland the highest position in the Scottish church. Despite being notably young for the appointment he was praised for his duties in the office, and mention was made of his "prudent conduct".

He died on 18 June 1720. His position in Haddington was filled by Rev Patrick Wilkie.

Family

In November 1703 he married Sarah Bennet Riddell, daughter of Rev Archibald Riddell, minister of Trinity College Church in Edinburgh. Their children included:

John Currie a merchant in Jamaica
Walter Currie
Isobel Currie married Thomas Elliot an Edinburgh lawyer

References
Citations

Sources

17th-century births
1720 deaths
Moderators of the General Assembly of the Church of Scotland